Otterbein is a town in Bolivar Township, Benton County and Shelby Township, Tippecanoe County, Indiana, named for William Otterbein Brown who donated land for the town. As of the 2010 census, its population was 1,262.

It is part of the Lafayette, Indiana Metropolitan Statistical Area.

History
Originally a site known as Pond Grove, Otterbein's first 60 lots were laid out by John Levering and his wife on October 25, 1872, with an addition by Mary A. Clancey on April 24, 1883.  The first home was built by Dr. John K. Thompson and the first business, a general store, by Henry H. Moore.  William Otterbein Brown, the farmer and stock-dealer for whom the town was named, held the office of postmaster until his death on February 18, 1879. Otterbein High School ran from 1910 to 1966, when the consolidated Benton Community School Corporation came into existence. The gym and most of the building burned in a fire in 1975.

As of 2018, Otterbein has two churches, Catholic and United Methodist, and a public library.

At one time, two sets of Nickel Plate Railroad tracks ran through the town. One set of tracks has since been removed, and the other is used by Kankakee, Beaverville and Southern Railroad. Since the end of 2008, the railroad right-of-way has been used for the placement of poles that carry electric power from the wind turbines in western Benton County to the substation at Montmorenci.

Haan Crafts, the Frontier Machine Company, and the Kerkhoff Truss Plant were the initial occupants in the industrial park at the east edge of town, which is actually in Tippecanoe County. The Otterbein post office has been in operation since 1872.

Geography
Otterbein occupies mostly flat, open farm land on the eastern border of Benton County in Bolivar Township, with eastern sections of the community extending into Tippecanoe County.  U.S. Route 52 passes along its north side and the Kankakee, Beaverville and Southern Railroad cuts through town to the south.

Oxford Street, old US 52, is the central east-west street and the only blinking traffic light in town is located at its junction with Main Street. Otterbein is known for its extremely wide, block-long Main Street that accommodates two rows of parallel parking in the middle of the street.

Demographics

2010 census
As of the census of 2010, there were 1,262 people, 502 households, and 335 families living in the town. The racial makeup of the town was 96.8% White (1211), 0.7% African American (9), 0.3% Native American (3), 0.1% Asian (1), 0.1% Pacific Islander, 0.8% from other races, and 1.2% from two or more races (13). Hispanic or Latino of any race were 3.1% of the population (38).

There were 502 households, of which 38.4% had children under the age of 18 living with them, 46.4% were married couples living together, 12.5% had a female householder with no husband present, 7.8% had a male householder with no wife present, and 33.3% were non-families. 27.1% of all households were made up of individuals, and 11.8% had someone living alone who was 65 years of age or older. The average household size was 2.51 and the average family size was 3.04.

The median age in the town was 32.4 years. 28% of residents were under the age of 18; 9.1% were between the ages of 18 and 24; 28.8% were from 25 to 44; 23.1% were from 45 to 64; and 11.1% were 65 years of age or older. The gender makeup of the town was 49.2% male and 50.8% female.

2000 census
As of the census of 2000, there were 1,312 people, 498 households, and 359 families living in the town. The racial makeup of the town was 98.02% White, 0.23% African American, 0.23% Native American, 0.61% from other races, and 0.91% from two or more races. Hispanic or Latino of any race were 1.07% of the population.

There were 498 households, out of which 42.4% had children under the age of 18 living with them, 54.2% were married couples living together, 12.2% had a female householder with no husband present, and 27.9% were non-families. 24.5% of all households were made up of individuals, and 11.8% had someone living alone who was 65 years of age or older. The average household size was 2.63 and the average family size was 3.11.

In the town, the population was spread out, with 30.8% under the age of 18, 8.8% from 18 to 24, 31.6% from 25 to 44, 17.1% from 45 to 64, and 11.6% who were 65 years of age or older. The median age was 32 years. For every 100 females, there were 96.1 males. For every 100 females age 18 and over, there were 86.8 males.

The median income for a household in the town was $40,524, and the median income for a family was $45,341. Males had a median income of $31,000 versus $20,944 for females. The per capita income for the town was $17,128. About 4.8% of families and 6.9% of the population were below the poverty line, including 6.8% of those under age 18 and 9.9% of those age 65 or over.

Notable people
 Richard Atha, Indiana State and NBA player, member Indiana Basketball Hall of Fame
 Adam Kennedy (1922–1997), actor, author, and painter
 Neal Musser, professional baseball player
 Donald E. Williams (1942–2016), Commander NASA space shuttle

Education
Students attend Otterbein Elementary School (kindergarten through sixth grade) and then continue their education at Benton Central Junior-Senior High School in Atkinson.

References

Further reading
 Mossman, Ed (1883), "History of Benton County: Past Events -- Present Condition" in Counties of Warren, Benton, Jasper and Newton, Indiana: Historical and Biographical, Chicago: F. A. Battey & Co.

Towns in Benton County, Indiana
Towns in Tippecanoe County, Indiana
Towns in Indiana
Lafayette metropolitan area, Indiana
Populated places established in 1872
1872 establishments in Indiana